Marinus Gerardus Adrianus "Marc" van Hintum (born 22 June 1967) is a Dutch former footballer who played professionally for Helmond Sport, Willem II, Vitesse Arnhem, Hannover 96 and RKC Waalwijk, as well as for the Dutch national side.

References

External links 
 Cv Marc van Hintum 
 Marc van Hintum at Ronald Zwiers 

1967 births
Living people
Dutch footballers
Dutch association football commentators
Netherlands international footballers
RKC Waalwijk players
SBV Vitesse players
Willem II (football club) players
Hannover 96 players
Bundesliga players
2. Bundesliga players
Sportspeople from Oss
Association football fullbacks
Footballers from North Brabant